Skyjet MG dba Air Liaison is a regional airline based in Quebec City, Quebec with its base at Québec City Jean Lesage International Airport. It operates scheduled flights to 16 domestic destinations from Monday to Friday.

Destinations 
Air Liaison began serving Montréal–Trudeau International Airport on September 10, 2020. Air Liaison operates scheduled services to the following domestic destinations (February 2021):

Scheduled flights

Charter and medevac services 
In addition to scheduled flights, in 2015 Air Liaison began offering medevac services for eastern Quebec. Air Liaison also offers charter services across Canada and the United States.

References

External links
Air Liaison

Airlines established in 2001
Canadian companies established in 2001
Air Transport Association of Canada
Companies based in Quebec
Regional airlines of Quebec
2001 establishments in Quebec